AFC Ajax is one of the most successful football clubs in Europe. They have won the European Cup/Champions League four times, and are one of three clubs that have won the competition three times consecutively. Ajax have also won the UEFA Cup Winners' Cup once, the UEFA Cup once, the UEFA Super Cup three times, the Intercontinental Cup twice and the International Football Cup once. The club has also appeared in three additional finals finishing as runners-up. In the 1979–80 season, Ajax player Søren Lerby was the top scorer of the European Cup with ten goals. Below is a list of all official European matches contested by Ajax.

Finals

European match history

Super Cups
Ajax played in the UEFA Super Cup four times, winning three titles and losing only in 1987.

Intercontinental Cup
Ajax played for the Intercontinental Cup twice, winning both occasions. In 1971 and 1973 Ajax declined to participate in the Intercontinental Cup.

European record
As of match played 23 February 2023.

Results

Appearances

 (*) = Only played qualifying rounds and did not participate in the main tournament

Record by club

Statistics accurate as of last match played against Union Berlin on 23 February 2023.

Honours

Notes

References

Europe
AFC Ajax